List of Walkley awards won by The Australian is a list of Walkleys won by journalists while writing for the national Australian newspaper The Australian.

Gold Walkleys

References

Australian journalism awards